Victoria Lancelotta is an editor for the Georgetown Review.  Lancelotta has written two books. Her fiction has also appeared in Glimmer Train, The Threepenny Review, the Mississippi Review Web, and other magazines. She has been a resident of the MacDowell Colony and the Djerassi Resident Artists' Program and was a visiting scholar at the 1997 Bread Loaf Writers' Conference.

She received her Master of Fine Arts from the University of Florida in 1994, and she won the Heinfield Transatlantic Award.

Bibliography

Novels 
Far (2003)
Here in the World (2000)
The Anniversary Trip (2009)

Published stories 
Practice (The Southern Review, Vol. 46.4, 2010.)

References 
Lancelotta's Profile
University of Florida info about alumni
Necofoffee.com info

Footnotes 

University of Florida alumni
Living people
Year of birth missing (living people)